Sir Samuel Thomas Evans  (4 May 1859 – 13 September 1918) was a Welsh barrister, judge and Liberal politician.

Background and education
Evans was born at Skewen, near Neath, Glamorganshire, the only son of John Evans, a grocer, and his wife Margaret, both originally of Cardiganshire. He was educated in Swansea, at University College, Aberystwyth, and the University of London.

Family

Evans married firstly Rachel, daughter of William Thomas, in 1887. They had one son. After his first wife's death in 1889 he married secondly Blanche, daughter of Charles Rule, in 1905. They had one daughter.

Legal career
He qualified as a solicitor in 1883. On 28 April 1891 he was admitted to the Middle Temple and on 10 June 1891 he was called to the Bar.
Evans gained a large practice on the South Wales circuit and in 1901 he became the last QC appointed by Queen Victoria. He served on the Neath Town Council during the 1880s. He was a Recorder of Swansea from 1906 to 1908 and became a Bencher of the Middle Temple in 1908. His reputation as a judge rests mostly on his role as President of the Prize Court established during the First World War.

Political career
In 1889, Evans sought election to the inaugural Glamorgan County Council but was unsuccessful both at the initial election and the by-election which followed the successful Conservative candidate's elevation to the aldermanic bench.

In 1890 he was elected to the House of Commons for Mid Glamorgan. He combined his parliamentary work with his legal practice in Wales. He was re-elected in 1892, 1895 and at the Khaki General Election of 1900;

At the General Election of January/February 1906 he was returned unopposed. In October 1906 upon appointment as Recorder of Swansea, an office of profit under the Crown, he was required to seek re-election and in the by-election he was returned unopposed. In 1908, he was appointed Solicitor-General in the Liberal administration of H. H. Asquith and knighted upon taking office.

He was re-elected at the following general election, in January 1910;

He was then sworn of the Privy Council in 1910.
In March 1910 Evans decided to give up his political career and accept the post of President of the Probate, Divorce and Admiralty Division of the High Court of Justice. His appointment was not popular with the legal establishment as he was considered to have little experience in these fields. He was appointed a GCB in 1916. However, he declined the offer of a peerage.

Evans died in September 1918 aged 59 and was buried at Skewen.

Electoral results

References

Sources

Books and Journals
Davis, H. W. C.; Weaver, J. R. H. The Dictionary of National Biography. 1912-1921. Oxford University Press.

Online

Other

External links 

 

1859 births
1918 deaths
20th-century Welsh judges
Liberal Party (UK) MPs for Welsh constituencies
Probate, Divorce and Admiralty Division judges
UK MPs 1886–1892
UK MPs 1892–1895
UK MPs 1895–1900
UK MPs 1900–1906
UK MPs 1906–1910
UK MPs 1910
Members of the Privy Council of the United Kingdom
Knights Bachelor
Knights Grand Cross of the Order of the Bath
Politicians awarded knighthoods
19th-century Welsh lawyers
Presidents of the Probate, Divorce and Admiralty Division